Mahmudul Karim Chowdhury is a Bangladesh Nationalist Party politician and the former Member of Parliament of Chittagong-16.

Career
Chowdhury was elected to parliament from Mymensingh-11 as a Bangladesh Nationalist Party candidate in 1979.

Death
Chowdhury died on 27 December 2012.

References

Bangladesh Nationalist Party politicians
2012 deaths
2nd Jatiya Sangsad members